Killarney Station is a pastoral lease that operates as a cattle station in the Victoria River District of the Northern Territory of Australia.

History

Killarney Station was established by Eric Izod with managing partner Ivor Hall in 1953.

Bill Tapp purchased Killarney following talks with Izod and Hall about buying Killarney Station in 1960. Tapp paid £90,000, a Northern Territory record price for a cattle station at that time. He received title to Killarney in 1962.

The Tapp family properties, including Killarney Station went into receivership in 1991. Brian Oxenford's Western Grazing Company purchased the property.

Wallco acquired Killarney in 2001 from Western Grazing Company. The property was being run in conjunction with neighbouring Birrimba Station forming an aggregation with an area of  that was supporting a herd of 41,000 Brahman cattle.

In 2012 the property was run by Wallco Pastoral Company until it was placed in receivership by the National Australia Bank before a refinancing.

Killarney was sold in 2014 to the Jumbuck Pastoral Company for about 35 million.

Most of Birrimba and a small portion of Killarney were burnt out by a bushfire in 2014.

See also
List of ranches and stations

References

 
Pastoral leases in the Northern Territory 
Stations (Australian agriculture)
1953 establishments in Australia